Thomas John Gerrard (1871–1916) was an English priest who wrote about the Catholic Church and eugenics.

Biography
Thomas John Gerrard was born in Lancashire in 1871.

He wrote several books, including The Church and eugenics, Marriage and parenthood: the Catholic ideal (1911, re-published in 1937 and 2009), and Bergson: an exposition and criticism from the point of view of St. Thomas.

He also wrote the entry "The Church and Eugenics" for the Catholic Encyclopedia.

He died in England in January 1916.

Works
 Marriage and Parenthood, the Catholic ideal, 1911
 Bergson; An Exposition and Criticism From the Point of View of St. Thomas Aquinas, 1913
 A Challenge to the Time-Spirit, 1914
 The Church and Eugenics, 1917

References

External links
 

1871 births
1916 deaths
Contributors to the Catholic Encyclopedia
English eugenicists
English priests
People from Lancashire (before 1974)